The Counter-Terrorism and Border Security Act 2019 (c. 3) is an Act of the Parliament of the United Kingdom. It received Royal assent on 12 February 2019 and came into force on 12 April 2019.

Provisions

Part 1 Counter-Terrorism
Chapter 1: 'Terrorist Offences' makes provision for the amendment of and creation of new terrorist related offences under Section 12 of the Terrorism Act 2000.

Clause 1 makes it an offence to express an opinion or belief that is supportive of a proscribed organisation in circumstances where the perpetrator is reckless as to whether a person to whom the expression is directed will be encouraged to support a proscribed organisation.

Clause 2 amends Section 13 of the Terrorism Act 2000, making it an offence to publish images of: items of clothing or any other article (such as a flag) which would arouse suspicions that the person is a member or supporter of a proscribed organisation.

Under Section 58 of the Terrorism Act 2000, it is already an offence to download information that is "likely to be useful to a person committing or preparing an act of terrorism." Clause 3 amends this to include streaming of such material, where it is not stored offline.

Section (4) further amends Section 58 (3) of the 2000 Act by adding that it is a reasonable excuse to collect such material if they did not realise the document or record was likely to contain information likely to be used by a person committing or preparing an act of terrorism, or whether the possession was for the purposes of journalism or academic research.

Part 2 Border security

Part 3 Final provisions

Justification 
The act was proposed to address activities of "hostile states". According to the Home Office, "After the spate of terrorist attacks of last year and the deadly nerve agent attack in Salisbury, our intelligence services and police made the case for an update of existing legislation and some new powers to help meet their operational needs and respond to the evolving threats posed by terrorism and hostile state activity."

Home Secretary Sajid Javid said, "This important piece of legislation will allow the police and MI5 to disrupt threats earlier, and ensure our laws reflect modern use of the internet. It will change existing laws to better manage terrorist offenders and permit more effective investigations."

See also
 Terrorism Act 2000
 Counter-Terrorism Act 2008
Counter-Terrorism and Security Act 2015

References

United Kingdom Acts of Parliament 2019
National security policies
Home Office (United Kingdom)
Counterterrorism in the United Kingdom
Terrorism laws in the United Kingdom